The Korop language, Durop – also known as Ododop or Erorop, is an Upper Cross River language of Nigeria.

References

Languages of Nigeria
Upper Cross River languages